This is a list of countries by papaya production from 2016 to 2020, based on data from the Food and Agriculture Organization Corporate Statistical Database. The estimated total world production for papayas in 2020 was 13,894,705 metric tonnes, up by 1.9% from 13,641,294 tonnes in 2019. India was by far the largest producer, accounting for over 43% of global production. Dependent territories are shown in italics.

Production by country

>100,000 tonnes

1,000–100,000 tonnes

<1,000 tonnes

Notes

References 

Lists by country
Lists of countries by production
Food and Agriculture Organization
Papaya
Papayas
Fruit production